The Tagish or Tagish Khwáan are a First Nations people of the Athabaskan-speaking ethnolinguistic group that lived around Tagish Lake and Marsh Lake, in Yukon of Canada. The Tagish intermarried heavily with Tlingit from the coast and the Tagish language became extinct in 2008. Today Tagish people live mainly in Carcross or Whitehorse and are members of the Carcross/Tagish First Nation or the Kwanlin Dün First Nation.

Members of the Tagish First Nation made the gold discovery that led to the Klondike Gold Rush: Keish (Skookum Jim Mason), Shaaw Tláa (Kate Carmack)] and Káa goox (Dawson Charlie).

The word Tagish also refers to the Tagish language, an Athabaskan language spoken by the ancestors of these people.

Tagish means "it (spring ice) is breaking up" and also gave its name to Tagish Lake.

References

External links
Yukon Native Language Centre
Yukon Native Language Centre
Carcross/Tagish First Nation

First Nations in Yukon